Easy Money is an American comedy-drama television series that aired on The CW from October 5, 2008 to August 16, 2009. The series was created by Diane Frolov and Andrew Schneider. The show—along with Valentine, Surviving Suburbia, and In Harm's Way—are shows programmed by Media Rights Capital (MRC), an independent producer of television programming. The Sunday night block (5pm–10pm) was sold to the producers on a leased-time basis from The CW after the network had no ratings success with the night.

Production of the series was put on hold in mid-October and was expected to resume within four to six weeks. Two weeks later, MRC decided to cancel both Easy Money and Valentine. On November 20, 2008, The CW announced that it was ending its Sunday Night agreement with MRC, removing the current shows and programming the night itself. On July 6, 2009, The CW announced that beginning July 26, the series would begin burning off the remaining episodes Sundays at 7 p.m.

Plot
28-year-old Morgan Buffkin (Hephner) finds himself in charge of Prestige Payday Loans, his eccentric family's enormously successful short-term loan business. Any doubts Morgan has about running his family's business are quickly replaced by dealing with family business. Morgan's brother Cooper (Ferguson) insists on driving a silver-plated Hummer, Morgan's sister Brandy (Lowes) has questionable morals, he suspects that his mother (Metcalfe) and father (Searcy) are not being completely honest with him about his relation to the family, and every so often, part-time detective Barry (Reinhold) drops in.

Cast
Laurie Metcalf as Bobette Buffkin
Nick Searcy as Roy Buffkin
Marsha Thomason as Julia Miller
Jeff Hephner as Morgan Buffkin
Jay R. Ferguson as Cooper Buffkin
Katie Lowes as Brandy Buffkin
Judge Reinhold as Barry

International syndication
Fox Life Serbia has aired the complete series. Fox Life Turkey aired all 8 episodes in 2009.

Episodes

References

External links
Official website

2000s American comedy-drama television series
2008 American television series debuts
2009 American television series endings
The CW original programming
Television series by Media Rights Capital
Television shows set in New Mexico